Kelly Rae Finley (born April 27, 1985) is an American basketball coach who is currently the head coach of the Florida Gators women's basketball team. An assistant coach for the Gators from 2017-2021, she served as the interim head coach of the Gators for the 2021-22 season and was hired as the 11th head coach of the program following the regular season. Prior to her tenure at the University of Florida, she was an assistant coach with Harvard, Colorado, and Arizona.

Biography 
Finley grew up in Minneapolis, Minnesota and attended the Breck School, where she played basketball under her father, Ray Finley, and led the team to the Minnesota Class 2A State Championship as a senior in 2004.

After attending Northwestern for her freshman season in 2004-05, Finley transferred to Colorado State University and played for the Rams from 2005 to 2008.

Coaching career 
Finley began her coaching career as a volunteer assistant with Harvard for the 2008-09 season. She became a fulltime assistant from 2009-2012. She followed up with coaching stints at Colorado from 2012-2016 and Arizona for the 2016-17 season. She served as a recruiting coordinator at all three schools. In 2017, she joined Florida's staff under new head coach Cameron Newbauer. She was promoted to associate head coach in 2019.

Following allegations of player mistreatment, Newbauer resigned as head coach abruptly on September 27, 2021. Finley was named the interim head coach for the 2021-22 season. Despite the preseason turmoil surrounding Newbauer's departure and expectations that the Gators would finish 11th in the Southeastern Conference, the season ended with the Gators exceeding expectations to finish 4th in the conference and earning an NCAA tournament berth for the first time since 2016. Finley was given the permanent head coaching position on February 28, 2022.

Head coaching record

References

External links
Florida Gators coaching bio
Colorado State Rams player bio

1985 births
Living people
Arizona Wildcats women's basketball coaches
Colorado Buffaloes women's basketball coaches
Colorado State Rams women's basketball players
Florida Gators women's basketball coaches
Harvard Crimson women's basketball coaches
Northwestern Wildcats women's basketball players
Sportspeople from Edina, Minnesota
American women's basketball players